Princess Uisun (1635–1662; birth name Yi Ae-suk) was a Joseon Royal Family member who became the adopted daughter of Hyojong of Joseon and Queen Inseon, so she could marry the Aisin Gioro prince Dorgon and later, prince Bolo.

Biography

Background 
Yi Ae-suk was born one of the four daughters and seven sons of Yi Gye-yun, himself a 4th great-grandson of Seongjong of Joseon, and a fourth cousin twice removed of Hyojong.

Political marriage
In 1650, Dorgon sent the minister of Ministry of Revenue, Gioro Bahana, as an emissary to the Joseon court, to forge an alliance with Hyojong of Joseon, asking the king to choose a suitable bride for him. The bride could be a daughter of either one of the royal family members or the king's subjects. Bahana delivered the order from the prince regent and was told that the king's daughter was only two years old, which he suggested that a female from the royal clan could be an option; on the other hand, the king's ministers greatly opposed offering any of their daughters as well.

Twenty days later, Ae-suk was given the title Princess Uisun and her biological father, Yi Gyeyun, was gifted cloth and rice as reward. Nearly one month after her adoption as Hyojong's daughter, Princess Uisun left the palace at Hanseong, accompanied by 16 maids, a female physician, and her nursemaid. After the her arrival in Beijing, Dorgon complained about the appearance of his new wife and her court maids, and he even doubted the loyalty from Joseon. Merely seven months later, Dorgon died in the same year. Princess Uisun was asked to remarry one of Dorgon's nephews, his general Prince Bolo of the Second Rank, but he also died in 1652.

Return to Korea
In the winter of 1655, Yi Gyeyun was dispatched as part of a diplomatic party to Beijing. Yi presented tribute and was entertained at a feast, during which he wept and petitioned for Princess Uisun to return to Korea, and his wish was granted. Princess Uisun returned to Joseon in the summer of 1656; on her return, Hyojong granted the princess a monthly pension to support the rest of her life. Yi Gyeyun's acts, however, received severe criticism from other court officials for requesting her return without consulting the king beforehand; under the pressure from the court, Yi Gyeyun lost his official position after a series of impeachments.

Princess Uisun died of an illness in 1662 and her burial rites were provided for by Hyeonjong of Joseon, who described her fate as pitiable.

Family
Father: Yi Gye-yun, Prince Geumrim (이계윤 금림군), 4th generation descendant of the Joseon royal house by Seongjong of Joseon
 Adoptive father: Hyojong of Joseon (조선 효종) (3 July 1619 - 23 June 1659)
Mother: Lady Yu of the Munhwa Yu clan (문화 유씨)
 Adoptive mother: Queen Inseon of the Deoksu Jang clan (인선왕후 장씨) (1618 - 1674)
 Siblings
 Older brother - Yi Jun (이준, 李浚)
 Older brother - Yi Su (이수, 李洙)
 Older brother - Yi Hae (이해, 李海)
Husband:
Aisin Gioro Dorgon, Prince Rui of the First Rank (多爾袞) (17 November 1612 – 31 December 1650)
Aisin Gioro Bolo, Prince Duanzhong of the First Rank (博洛) (1613 – 23 April 1652)

References

Notes

Works cited

17th-century Korean people
1635 births
1662 deaths
Princesses of Joseon
Qing dynasty imperial consorts
17th-century Korean women
Qing dynasty princesses consorts